Leslie Oram (18 March 1893 – 22 July 1966) was an Australian rules footballer who played with Collingwood in the Victorian Football League (VFL). Les took up umpiring in 1931 in the Nar Nar Goon district.

Notes

External links 

Les Oram's profile at Collingwood Forever

1893 births
1966 deaths
Australian rules footballers from Victoria (Australia)
Collingwood Football Club players
Essendon Association Football Club players